Naomasa (written: 直政, 直正, 直方, 尚正 or 尚政) is a masculine Japanese given name. Notable people with the name include:

, Japanese samurai
, Japanese samurai
, Japanese daimyō
, Japanese daimyō
, Japanese daimyō
, Imperial Japanese Navy admiral
, Japanese geographer
, Japanese samurai

Japanese masculine given names